A choctaw turn is a turn in figure skating that involves both a change of foot and a change of edge and lobe.  Choctaws are the two-foot equivalents of rockers and counters, in the same way that mohawk turns are the two-foot equivalents of three turns and brackets.

The most familiar choctaw seen in free skating is the step from a back inside edge to a forward outside edge that is used as the entrance to forward spins. Otherwise choctaws are most commonly used as elements of step sequences.

In Canada this turn is called an S turn due to its shape. It was changed on October 28, 2020 by Skate Canada. In this announcement they also changed the Mohawk turn to the C turn. They stated this was done to "improve equity, diversity and inclusion in the sport." They also said that this change works toward the decolonizing of their terminology.

Choctaws are also prominently featured in several compulsory dances in ice dancing, including:

 The Kilian features a crossed open choctaw from a left forward inside edge to a  right back outside edge, with the right foot placed on the ice slightly in front of the left foot at the turn. It is called an open turn because the left foot ends up behind the right foot after the turn.
 The Blues includes a closed choctaw, again from a left forward inside edge to a right back outside edge, but in this case the right foot is placed just behind the left heel at the turn. It is called a closed turn because the left foot is extended in front after the turn.
 The Rhumba includes a double choctaw sequence. The first is a wide open choctaw, once again from left forward inside to right back outside, but in this case the left foot crosses wide in back at the turn. From the right back outside edge, the dancers then immediately execute a wide closed choctaw to the left forward inside edge, again with the free foot crossing wide in back at the turn.

References 

Figure skating elements